Byadanur  is a village in the southern state of Karnataka, India. It is located in the Pavagada taluk of Tumkur district in Karnataka.

Demographics
As of 2001 India census, Byadanur had a population of 5105 with 2601 males and 2504 females.

See also
 Tumkur
 Districts of Karnataka

References

External links
 http://Tumkur.nic.in/

Villages in Tumkur district